Pantelis Rizogiannis (born 1 February 1988) is a Greek professional footballer who plays as a defensive midfielder for Super League 2 club Trikala.

External links
Profile at epae.org
 Guardian Football

1988 births
Living people
Greek footballers
Greece under-21 international footballers
Xanthi F.C. players
Trikala F.C. players
Niki Volos F.C. players
Association football midfielders
Panelefsiniakos F.C. players
Doxa Drama F.C. players
Olympiacos Volos F.C. players
Footballers from Karditsa